Froment's sign is a special test of the wrist for palsy of the ulnar nerve, specifically, the action of adductor pollicis.  Froment's maneuver can also refer to the cogwheel effect from contralateral arm movements seen in Parkinson's disease.


Process of examination
To perform the test, a patient is asked to hold an object, usually a flat object such as a  piece of paper, between the thumb and index finger (pinch grip). The examiner then attempts to pull the object out of the subject's hands.
 A normal individual will be able to maintain a hold on the object without difficulty.
 However, with ulnar nerve palsy, the patient will experience difficulty maintaining a hold and will compensate by flexing the flexor pollicis longus of the thumb to maintain grip pressure causing a pinching effect. 
 Clinically, this compensation manifests as flexion of the interphalangeal joint of the thumb (rather than adduction, as would occur with correct use of the adductor pollicis).
 The compensation of the affected hand results in a weak pinch grip with the tips of the thumb and index finger, therefore, with the thumb in obvious flexion.
 Note that the flexor pollicis longus is normally innervated by the anterior interosseous branch of the median nerve. 
 Anterior interosseous branch comes off more proximally than the wrist, in evaluating lacerations near the wrist.
 Simultaneous hyperextension of the thumb MCP joint is indicative of ulnar nerve compromise.  This is also known as Jeanne's sign.

Eponym
It is named after French neurologist Jules Froment.

References

Symptoms and signs: Nervous system